Teppo Rastio (born February 15, 1934) is a retired professional ice hockey player who played in the SM-liiga for Lukko and Ilves. Rastio was inducted to the Finnish Hockey Hall of Fame in 1985.

Rastio was also known as a footballer. He played two seasons in the Finnish premier division Mestaruussarja for Ilves-Kissat in 1957–1958. Rastio capped once for the Finland national team in 1957.

References

External links
 
 Finnish Hockey Hall of Fame bio

1934 births
Association footballers not categorized by position
Finland international footballers
Finnish footballers
Ice hockey players at the 1960 Winter Olympics
Ice hockey players with retired numbers
Ilves players
Living people
Lukko players
Olympic ice hockey players of Finland
People from Naantali
Sportspeople from Southwest Finland